Princess Adelgunde of Bavaria (19 March 1823 – 28 October 1914) was a daughter of Ludwig I of Bavaria and Therese of Saxe-Hildburghausen. She was Duchess of Modena by her marriage to Francis V, Duke of Modena.

Family
Adelgunde was the sixth child and third daughter of Ludwig I of Bavaria and Therese of Saxe-Hildburghausen. She was born in Würzburg on 19 March 1823. Included among her siblings were Maximilian II of Bavaria, Mathilde, Grand Duchess of Hesse and by Rhine, King Otto of Greece and Luitpold, Prince Regent of Bavaria.

Marriage
On 20 March 1842 in Munich, Adelgunde married Archduke Francis of Austria-Este (1819–75), eldest son of Francis IV, Duke of Modena and Maria Beatrice of Savoy.  The couple had only one child, Princess Anne Beatrice Theresa Maria (October 19, 1848 in Gries, Bolzano – July 8, 1849 in Modena).  Francis acceded to the dukedom on his father's death in 1846 as Francis V.  After the Italian Unification, Francis was deposed, and he and his wife were exiled to Vienna, where he died fifteen years later.

Death
Adelgunde survived her husband for many years and died in Munich at the age of 91. She never remarried and is interred in Vienna.

A pearl brooch formerly owned by her was auctioned at Sotheby's in 2012.

Ancestry

References

|-

|-

|-

|-

1823 births
1914 deaths
People from Würzburg
House of Wittelsbach
Bavarian princesses
Modenese princesses
Duchesses of Modena
Duchesses of Reggio
Austria-Este
Austrian princesses
Duchesses of Massa
Princesses of Carrara
19th-century German people
20th-century German people
19th-century German women
20th-century German women
Burials at the Imperial Crypt
Daughters of kings